Béla Horváth de Szentgyörgy (29 January 1886 – 3 October 1978) was a Hungarian public servant and politician, who served as Secretary of State for the Interior in the cabinet of Prime Minister Géza Lakatos for a brief time between September and October 1944.

Biography
Béla Horváth was born into a Roman Catholic noble family on 29 January 1886 in Apatelek, Arad County in Austria-Hungary (now Mocrea, Romania), as the son of Gyula Horváth (1852–1924), who served as Prefect of Zimbró, Apatelek, Borosjenő and finally Sikló. Béla Horváth graduated in 1903 from the Reformed Church College in Szászváros (now Orăștie, Romania), where he was a classmate and friend of Petru Groza. He went to Budapest and graduated in 1907 from the "School of Law and Political Science" at the University of Budapest (present-day Eötvös Loránd University). Following this, he began doctoral studies in political science at the Franz Joseph University in Kolozsvár (now Cluj-Napoca). In January 1911, Horváth began his career at the Interior Ministry in Budapest. His poor eyesight prevented his service in the First World War.

Following the fall of the Hungarian Soviet Republic in August 1919, Horváth was reinstated to the Ministry of Interior. He was appointed a secretary in the minister's office on 30 August 1921. He became head of a department within the ministry on 30 June 1928. He was granted the rank of ministerial councillor on 24 August 1931. He was entitled as secretary of state on 4 July 1941.

In 1926, Béla Horváth married Sarolta Bund (1900–1982), daughter of Károly Bund (1869–1931). They had two children, a daughter (Magda) born in 1927 and a son (George) born in 1931.

On September 9, 1944, Béla Horváth was appointed Secretary of State for the Interior, and thus acting minister during the brief Lakatos government, as Minister Miklós Bonczos was ill and unable to fulfill his duties. In that capacity, Horváth collaborated with Swedish diplomat Raoul Wallenberg to save the lives of many Jews in Budapest. Horváth provided Wallenberg the use of the Ministry's printing press to prepare Swedish "protective passports," which identified the Hungarian Jewish bearers as Swedish subjects awaiting repatriation. Horváth also ordered Hungarian gendarmes to prevent the deportation from Hungary of any Jewish person, using force if necessary. With the Arrow Cross coup on October 16, 1944, Béla Horváth was dismissed from this position and placed under house arrest.

After the war, the new Hungarian government asked Béla Horváth to serve as Interior Minister, but he declined the offer. In 1951, Béla Horváth and family were exiled for several years to Hajdúdorog (Hajdú-Bihar County), but then returned to Budapest. Béla Horváth died in Budapest on 3 October 1978 and was buried at the Farkasréti Cemetery.

References

Sources 

 
 
 
 

1886 births
1978 deaths
People from Ineu
20th-century Hungarian people
The Holocaust in Hungary
Burials at Farkasréti Cemetery